A Banda das Velhas Virgens is a 1979 Brazilian film by Amácio Mazzaropi.

In this movie, the character key, called 'Gostoso', is responsible for a band formed by older women and religious women. Everything goes well until the farmer is expelled, along with the family of their land. He restarts his life in the capital, collecting scrap, and becomes the main suspect of a theft.

Notes

1979 films
Brazilian comedy films
1970s Portuguese-language films
1979 comedy films